The Strange Case of Mary Page is a 1916 American drama film serial directed by J. Charles Haydon. Most of the film is considered to be lost, with only two of the episodes preserved.

Cast

 Henry B. Walthall as Phil Langdon, Attorney
 Edna Mayo as Mary Page
 Sidney Ainsworth as David Pollock
 Harry Dunkinson as E.H. Daniels, Show Manager
 John Cossar as Prosecuting Attorney
 Frank Dayton as Dan Page
 Frances Raymond as Mrs. Page
 John Thorn as Jim Cunningham
 Arthur W. Bates as Young Gambler
 Edmund Cobb
 Frank Hamilton
 Frank Benedict (as Francis Benedict)
 William Chester
 Virginia Valli (as Miss Valli)
 Thomas Commerford as Judge
 Jessie Jones
 Honus Smith
 Edward Arnold as Dr. Foster (Ch. 5)
 Richardson Cotton as Juror (Ch. 5)
 Ernest Cossart

See also
 List of film serials
 List of film serials by studio
 List of lost films

References

External links

 
 

1916 films
American silent serial films
1916 drama films
American black-and-white films
Lost American films
Films directed by J. Charles Haydon
Essanay Studios films
Silent American drama films
1916 lost films
Lost drama films
1910s American films
1910s English-language films